Agden may refer to:

Agden, Cheshire West and Chester, England
Agden, Cheshire East, England
Agden Reservoir, Sheffield, England